Thymidine kinase 2, mitochondrial is a protein that in humans is encoded by the TK2 gene.

Function

This gene encodes a deoxyribonucleoside kinase that specifically phosphorylates thymidine, deoxycytidine, and deoxyuridine. The encoded enzyme localizes to the mitochondria and is required for mitochondrial DNA synthesis. Mutations in this gene are associated with a myopathic form of mitochondrial DNA depletion syndrome. Alternate splicing results in multiple transcript variants encoding distinct isoforms, some of which lack transit peptide, so are not localized to mitochondria.

This kinase is not present in yeast.

References 

Human proteins